Kirov Bridge  (Belarusian: Кіраўскі мост)  is a bridge in Vitsebsk, Belarus, on the Dzvina river.

References

Bridges in Belarus
Crossings of the Daugava River
Bridges built in the Soviet Union
Buildings and structures in Vitebsk